The Tharrkari, also referred to as the Targari, are an Aboriginal Australian people of the Gascoyne region of Western Australia.

Language

The Tharrkari spoke one of four dialects of Mantharta, the other members of the dialect continuum being the Thiin, Warriyangka and Djiwarli.

Country
Their southern boundary was around Middalya, Moogooree, and the Kennedy Range. Their eastern border was with the Wariangga and the Malgaru.

History of contact
With the advent of white colonization and pressures from coastal development, the Tharrkari are said to have migrated eastwards to the Lyons River.

Alternative names
 Dalgari, Tarlgarri
 Dargari
 Tarkari, Tarkarri
 Tarugar

Source:

Notes

Citations

Sources

Aboriginal peoples of Western Australia
Gascoyne